K-W United FC was a Canadian women’s soccer team, founded in 2006. The team was a member of the USL W-League, the second tier of women’s soccer in the United States and Canada. The team played in the Central Conference against teams from Laval, London, Ottawa, Quebec City, and Toronto.

The team played its home games at University Stadium in the city of Waterloo, Ontario. The club's colours were white, light blue and dark blue.

The team was founded in 2006 as the Hamilton Lady Avalanche. For the 2011 season, the team changed their name to Hamilton FC Rage. In 2013, the team moved to Kitchener–Waterloo, and were given their current name.

Year-by-year

External links
 
 K-W United FC on USL page

References

Women's soccer clubs in Canada
Soccer clubs in Ontario
United Soccer League teams based in Canada
USL W-League (1995–2015) teams
2006 establishments in Ontario
K-W United FC